Popielów may refer to:
Popielów, Masovian Voivodeship, a village in Węgrów County, Masovian Voivodeship, Poland
Popielów, Opole Voivodeship, a village in Opole County, Opole Voivodeship, Poland